The inaugural Federation Shield rugby league competition was held in 2006. This competition is organised by the Rugby Football League and was contested by England, France, Samoa and Tonga. England defeated Tonga 32-14 in the final to lift the Federation Shield for the first time. No tournament has taken place since and its future is unclear.


Results

Standings

Final

Rob Purdham captained the victorious England side in this tournament, with Matt Diskin as the vice-captain. The Paul Cullen coached side entered the final as favourites following a successful group stage with three wins from three matches.

See also

References

External links

Federation Shield
2006 in rugby league
2006 in French rugby league
2006 in Tongan sport
2006 in Samoan sport
2006 in English rugby league
European rugby league competitions